There are two terrestrial national parks and six marine national parks in the Seychelles. The parks are administered by Seychelles National Environment Commission (SNEC), which falls under the Department of the Environment.

National parks

Terrestrial
Morne Seychellois National Park
Praslin National Park
Ramos National Park

Marine
Baie Ternay Marine National Park
Curieuse Marine National Park
Ile Coco Marine National Park
Port Launay Marine National Park
Silhouette Island Marine National Park
Ste Anne Marine National Park

See also
List of national parks

References

Seychelles
 
National parks
National parks